The First United Methodist Church is a historic  Carpenter Gothic church in Jasper, Florida. It is located at 405 Central Avenue, S.W. On September 29, 1978, it was added to the National Register of Historic Places as United Methodist Church.

See also

 National Register of Historic Places listings in Florida

References

External links
First United Methodist Church, Jasper, Florida website

Churches completed in 1878
19th-century Methodist church buildings in the United States
Churches in Hamilton County, Florida
Churches on the National Register of Historic Places in Florida
Carpenter Gothic church buildings in Florida
United Methodist churches in Florida
National Register of Historic Places in Hamilton County, Florida
1878 establishments in Florida